The Zlín Z 43 is a Czech four-seat light aircraft. A development of the two-seat Zlín Z 42, it is a low-wing monoplane. A developed version, the Zlín Z 143 remains in production.

Design and development
After successful production of the Z-26 aircraft family, the Czechoslovak aircraft manufacturer Moravan, began design of a new series of training aircraft, known as the Z-40 family.  Unlike the previous tandem-seat aircraft, the Z-40 family featured a side-by-side cockpit. It was available in two basic variants, a two-seat trainer, the Zlín Z-42, and a four-seat aircraft, the Zlin Z-43 capable of being used both as a trainer and a tourer.

The resulting design is a single-engined low-wing monoplane of all-metal construction and a fixed nosewheel undercarriage.  The Z 43 shares 80% of its structure with the Z 42, but is fitted with a revised fuselage accommodating a four-seater cabin and a more powerful engine.  The Z-43's wings are of greater span and do not have the slight forward sweep of the Z- 42.

The Z-43 first flew on 10 December 1968, with production starting in 1972.  It proved less popular than its two-seat contemporary, and production ended in 1977 after 80 aircraft were built.

The Z-143 is a version introduced in 1992, powered by a six-cylinder Lycoming O-540 engine, in parallel to the Z-42 being re-engined with a Lycoming to become the Z-242.

Variants

Zlín Z-43
Base model
Zlín Z-43L
Experimental model with Lycoming AE10540 D4B5 engine. Has noticeable short engine cowling. Only one was built (C/N: 0084, reg: OK-LOW, later OM-LOW)  in 1990. It was converted back to stock Z 43 after 307 flight hours in 1998.
Zlín Z-43M
Experimental model. Only one was built
Zlín Z-143
Improved model
Aeronautical Manufacturing Enterprise Safir-43
An Algerian licence-built copy of the Zlín Z-43

Operational history

Use by Tamil Tigers

Pictures released by the Tamil Tigers in Sri Lanka indicate that they operated Czech-built Zlin Z-143 single-engine, four-seater light aircraft modified to carry four bombs mounted on the undercarriage.

The Air Tigers carried out a suicide air raid on Colombo on 20 February 2009 using two of these aircraft. Under heavy anti-aircraft fire, one of these aircraft crashed into the Sri Lanka Inland Revenue Department building in Colombo. The other craft was shot down near Sri Lanka Air Force Base at Katunayake.

Operators

Civil operators

Hungarian Police - 1 was in service in 1976, but a few weeks after the introduction of the model it crashed into Lake Balaton.

Military operators

Algerian Air Force (produced locally under Safir-43 name)

Cuban Air Force

East German Air Force

Hungarian Air Force

North Macedonia Air Brigade

Liberation Tigers of Tamil Eelam (used by the Air Tigers branch)

Specifications (Z 43)

See also

References

External links

 EASA Type Certificate Data Sheet: Zlin Z 43 Series, Issue 8, 25 April 2016
 Airliners.net - Zlin-143

1960s Czechoslovakian civil trainer aircraft
Zlín aircraft
Military equipment of Slovenia
1990s Algerian military trainer aircraft
Single-engined tractor aircraft
Low-wing aircraft
Aircraft first flown in 1968